Filippo Magnini (born 2 February 1982)  is an Italian retired competitive swimmer  who was twice 100 metres freestyle World champion and three times European champion at that distance.

Biography
Magnini was born in Pesaro, Marche.

As a youth he played basketball, soccer, beach volleyball and tennis, but shifted to swimming at the age of ten. His first cap with Italian Swimming National Team was in 1998. Raised as a breaststroker, after 2000 he dedicated totally to freestyle swimming, soon to achieving noteworthy results. Magnini gained his first international honour in 2003, with a silver medal in 100 m freestyle at the European Swimming Championships (short course) in Dublin. He won three more gold medals (in the 100 m, 4×100 m relay and 4×200 m relay freestyle) and one bronze medal at the 2004 European Championships (long course) in Madrid. At the 2004 Summer Olympics Magnini won the bronze medal in the 4×200 m freestyle relay, achieving 5th place in the 100 m freestyle. His steady rise reached its highest point at the 2005 World Aquatics Championships, where he won the gold medal in the men's 100 m freestyle with the time of 48.12, then the all-time second fastest behind Pieter van den Hoogenband's world record.

At the 2006 European Aquatics Championships he won the gold medal in the 100 m and in the 4×200 m freestyle races, and a bronze in the 200 m freestyle. The following year, he defended his world championship gold medal in the 100 m, when he tied for first place with Canadian Brent Hayden in a time of 48.43, resulting in joint gold.  He also won a silver medal in the 4 × 100 m.  Since then he has won silver and medals at the World Short Course Championships (silver – 100 m freestyle, 2007, 4 × 100 m freestyle, 2012, 4 × 200 m freestyle, 2014; bronze – 4 × 200 m freestyle, 2008, 4 x 50 m freestyle, 2014), and gold, silver and bronze medals at European level.

Magnini's nickname is "Superpippo". Pippo is the normal Italian nickname of Filippo but also of Goofy's Italian version, and therefore the complete nickname refers to the funny superhero in which the comics character transforms sometimes in his Italian edition. From August 2011 has a romance with fellow swimmer Federica Pellegrini.

On 8 July 2019, it was reported that Magnini saved newlywed Andrea Benedetto from drowning off a Sardinian beach. "The bather was in a lot of trouble: he was quite frightened, he was really stuck and had swallowed some seawater," Magnini said. "When I reached him he wasn't even able to speak, and it wasn't easy to lift him on to the raft, so we laid him on an airbed that some other bathers had nearby."

London 2012 controversy
At the 2012 Olympics Magnini failed to qualify for the finals in all the events he was competing in. After these disappointing performances he blamed the coach and the swimming team leaders for poor training management of the whole Italian team, spurring a strong media reaction for what was judged as an immature and irresponsible behavior.

Palmarès

Personal bests
In long-course swim pools Magnini's personal bests are:

 100 m freestyle: 48.04 (46.52 in short course)
 200 m freestyle: 1:47.20 (1:42.89 in short course)

See also
 Italian swimmers multiple medalists at the internetional competitions* List of Italian records in swimming
 Italian record progression 100 metres freestyle
 Italian record progression 200 metres freestyle
 List of Mediterranean Games records in swimming

References

External links
 
 Magnini Filippo on agendadiana.com 
 Magnini Filippo on Italian Swimming Federation's website 
 

1982 births
Living people
People from Pesaro
Italian male swimmers
Olympic swimmers of Italy
Swimmers at the 2004 Summer Olympics
Swimmers at the 2008 Summer Olympics
Swimmers at the 2012 Summer Olympics
Swimmers at the 2016 Summer Olympics
Olympic bronze medalists for Italy
Olympic bronze medalists in swimming
Italian male freestyle swimmers
World Aquatics Championships medalists in swimming
Medalists at the FINA World Swimming Championships (25 m)
European Aquatics Championships medalists in swimming
Medalists at the 2004 Summer Olympics
Mediterranean Games gold medalists for Italy
Mediterranean Games silver medalists for Italy
Swimmers at the 2005 Mediterranean Games
Swimmers at the 2009 Mediterranean Games
Mediterranean Games medalists in swimming
Sportspeople from the Province of Pesaro and Urbino